Ri Yong-gwang (born 15 August 1982) is a North Korean former footballer. He represented North Korea on at least two occasions in 2005.

Career statistics

International

References

1982 births
Living people
North Korean footballers
North Korea international footballers
Association football midfielders
Pyongyang Sports Club players